Lorenzo Pasciuti (born 24 September 1989) is an Italian footballer who plays as a winger for Serie D club Grosseto.

Club career
Born in Carrara, Pasciuti made his senior debuts with Massese in Serie C1. After being sparingly used in his two-year spell he joined Biellese in Serie D.

Pasciuti remained in the same division in the following year, appearing with Pisa. In December 2009 he moved to Carpi, also in the fifth level. With the Biancorossi he achieved two promotions, and scored five goals during the 2010–11 season. In the end of 2012–13, he appeared 26 times (22 in the regular season), as his side was promoted to Serie B for the first time ever.

On 24 September 2013 Pasciuti made his division debut, starting in a 0–0 home draw against Brescia. On 10 January of the following year he renewed his link, until 2016; roughly a month later Pasciuti scored his first goal in the second level, netting his side's second of a 4–1 success at Padova. Carpi won the 2014–15 Serie B, gaining promotion to Serie A, meaning Pasciuti had enjoyed four promotions with the club, seeing them rise from the fifth tier of Italian football to the first.

On 13 July 2019, he signed with Carrarese.

On 15 December 2022, Pasciuti moved to Grosseto.

Career statistics

Club

References

External links

1984 births
Living people
People from Carrara
Sportspeople from the Province of Massa-Carrara
Footballers from Tuscany
Italian footballers
Association football wingers
Serie A players
Serie B players
Serie C players
Serie D players
U.S. Massese 1919 players
A.S.D. La Biellese players
Pisa S.C. players
A.C. Carpi players
Carrarese Calcio players
U.S. Grosseto 1912 players